Prestwich is a town in Greater Manchester, England.

Prestwich may also refer to:

People

 Prestwich baronets, an English baronetcy, including a list of people who bore the title
 Grace Prestwich (1832–1899), Scottish author and illustrator
 James Caldwell Prestwich (1852–1940), English architect
 John Alfred Prestwich (1874–1952), English engineer and inventor
 Joseph Prestwich (1912–1896), British geologist and businessman
 J. O. Prestwich (1914–2003), British medievalist
 Michael Prestwich (born 1943), British medievalist, son of J.O.
 Steve Prestwich (1954–2011), British-Australian musician
 Dawn Prestwich (fl. 1992–2017), American television writer and producer

Other
 Prestwich-cum-Oldham, an ancient parish in Lancashire
 Prestwich (UK Parliament constituency), a former parliamentary constituency including Prestwich
 Middleton and Prestwich (UK Parliament constituency), a former parliamentary constituency including Prestwich

See also